Metallurgical Corporation of China Limited is a listed company in Shanghai and Hong Kong stock exchanges. It is a subsidiary of China Metallurgical Group Corporation (MCC). In the past Baosteel Group was a minority shareholder.

History

Operations

Mainland China

Saindak Copper-Gold Project (SCGP) in Pakistan
SCGP is a copper mining project owned by Government of Pakistan. The MCC Holding Hong Kong Corp. Ltd. and MCC Petroli Hong Kong Corp. Ltd. constructed the project under agreement with Government of Pakistan from 1990–1995 on turnkey basis. The project remained idle up to 2002, when Pakistan's government sought for foreign investors to provide funding for the project. The MCC won the bidding for a 10-year lease up to October 2012 and started the commercial production of the SCGP. The agreement was further extended for a period of 5 years up to October 2017. The agreement was again extended for another period of 5 years up to October 2022.

Copper mining in Afghanistan
In 2007, China Metallurgical Group Corporation won the bidding for the price of US Dollars 909 million. Presently it is  moving ahead with a copper mining project in Aynak, Afghanistan. In December 2009 there were about 3000 Afghan workers and about 70 Chinese engineers on site.

As of 2021, the project is not yet starting the construction phase.

Nickel mining in Papua New Guinea
Ramu NiCo Management (MCC) Limited ('Ramu NiCo') is currently constructing a nickel mine in mountains above the Ramu River and processing plant on the Rai Coast of the Madang Province of Papua New Guinea. Ramu NiCo's web site says the company is 'sponsored by' China Metallurgical Group Corporation and that at US$1.4 billion its project is China's largest overseas mining investment. The company says the project has a total reserve of 140 million tons of nickel and will have a mine life of 40 years.

The project has sparked controversy over its deep sea tailings disposal plan, previously approved by the PNG Department of Environment and Conservation, and blasting work to build the outlet was halted by an injunction in the National Court of Papua New Guinea on 19 March 2010.

References

External links
Official Site

Companies listed on the Hong Kong Stock Exchange
Companies listed on the Shanghai Stock Exchange
Companies in the CSI 100 Index
H shares
Companies based in Beijing
Metal companies of China
Chinese companies established in 2008
Conglomerate companies of China
Manufacturing companies established in 2008